This article lists the confirmed squads for the 2010 Women's Hockey World Cup tournament held in Rosario, Argentina between August 29 and September 11, 2010.

Pool A

Australia
Head coach: Frank Murray

Germany
Head coach: Michael Behrmann

India
Head coach: Sandeep Somesh

Japan
Head coach: Yasuda Zenjiiro

Netherlands
Head coach: Herman Kruis

New Zealand
Head coach: Mark Hager

Pool B

Argentina
Head coach: Carlos Retegui

China
Head coach: Kim Sang Ryul

England
Head coach: Danny Kerry

Korea
Head coach: Kang Keon-Wook

South Africa
Head coach: Giles Bonnet

Spain
Head coach: Pablo Usoz

References

 

2010 Women's Hockey World Cup
Women's Hockey World Cup squads